Loryma radamalis is a species of snout moth in the genus Loryma. It was described by Ragonot in 1891, and is known from Madagascar.

References

Moths described in 1891
Pyralini
Moths of Madagascar